Jérôme Cousin (born 5 June 1989) is a French professional road racing cyclist, who currently rides for UCI ProTeam .

Major results

2006
 5th Chrono des Nations Juniors
2008
 3rd Overall Tour du Haut-Anjou
 9th Chrono des Nations Espoirs
2010
 8th Overall Ronde de l'Isard
1st Stage 1
 10th Overall Thüringen Rundfahrt der U23
2011
 7th Overall Danmark Rundt
 9th Polynormande
2012
 1st  Overall Tour de Normandie
1st Stage 2
 Rhône-Alpes Isère Tour
1st  Points classification
1st Stage 3
2013
 2nd Overall Étoile de Bessèges
1st  Young rider classification
1st Stage 3
 Tour de France
 Combativity award Stages 1 & 10
2018
 1st Stage 5 Paris–Nice
  Combativity award Stage 4 Tour de France
2019
 3rd Overall Vuelta a Castilla y León
 7th Paris–Camembert
2020
  Combativity award Stage 3 Tour de France

Grand Tour general classification results timeline

References

External links 
Cycling Base: Jérôme Cousin

Team Europcar: Jérôme Cousin

1989 births
Living people
French male cyclists
Cyclists from Loire-Atlantique